NKO can refer to:

 The N'Ko script and written language of West Africa
 People's Commissariat for Defence of the Soviet Union existed in 1934-1946